This is a list of award winners and league leaders for the New York Mets professional baseball team.

Team award
1969 – National League Championship Series Trophy
 – World Series Trophy
1973 – National League Championship Series Trophy
 – Baseball America Organization of the Year
 – Baseball America Organization of the Year
1986 National League Championship Series Trophy
 – Commissioner's Trophy (World Series)
 – Baseball America Organization of the Year
2000 – Warren Giles Trophy (National League champion)
2015 – Warren Giles Trophy (National League champion)

Team records (single-season and career)

Team captains
 Keith Hernandez, 1987–89 (co-captain with Gary Carter, 1988–89)
 Gary Carter, 1988–89 (co-captain with Keith Hernandez)
 John Franco, 2001–04
 David Wright, 2013–18

Individual awards

Cy Young Award
Tom Seaver, 
Dwight Gooden, 
R. A. Dickey, 
Jacob deGrom,

Rookie of the Year Award

Tom Seaver, 
Jon Matlack, 
Darryl Strawberry, 
Dwight Gooden, 
Jacob deGrom, 
Pete Alonso,

Associated Press Manager of the Year Award (discontinued)
Gil Hodges

Manager of the Year Award
Buck Showalter (2022)

Hank Aaron Award (top hitter in league)
None

HR Leader (NL) 
Dave Kingman, 
Darryl Strawberry, 
Howard Johnson, 
Pete Alonso,

RBI Leader (NL)
Howard Johnson, 
Pete Alonso,

Batting Title (NL)
Jose Reyes, 
Jeff McNeil,

Rawlings Gold Glove Award

Pitcher
Ron Darling, 1989

Catcher
none

First base
Keith Hernandez, 1983–1988

Second base
Doug Flynn, 1980

Shortstop
Bud Harrelson, 1971
Rey Ordóñez, 1997–1999

Third base
Robin Ventura, 1999
David Wright, 2007, 2008

Outfield
Tommie Agee, 1970
Carlos Beltrán, 2006–2008
Juan Lagares, 2014

Wilson Defensive Player of the Year Award

See explanatory note at Atlanta Braves award winners and league leaders
Team (all positions)
 (2012)
 (2013)

Pitcher (in MLB)
Jacob deGrom (2015)

Silver Slugger Award

Pitcher
Dwight Gooden, 1992
Mike Hampton, 2000

Catcher
Gary Carter, 1985, 1986
Mike Piazza, 1998–2002

First base
Keith Hernandez, 1984

Second base
Edgardo Alfonzo, 1999
Jeff McNeil, 2022

Shortstop
José Reyes, 2006

Third base
Howard Johnson, 1989, 1991
David Wright, 2007, 2008

Outfield
Darryl Strawberry, 1988, 1990
Carlos Beltrán, 2006–2007
Yoenis Cespedes, 2016

Rolaids Relief Man of the Year AwardSee footnoteJohn Franco, 1990
Armando Benítez, 2001

MLB Reliever of the Year Award

 Edwin Díaz, 2022

Major League Triple Crown: PitchingSee: Major League Baseball Triple CrownDwight Gooden

Triple Crown (NL): PitchingSee: Dwight Gooden (1985)

MLB Comeback Player of the Year Award
Ray Knight, 1986
Rickey Henderson, 1999
Matt Harvey, 2015

Roberto Clemente Award
Gary Carter, 1989
Al Leiter, 2000
Carlos Delgado, 2006
Curtis Granderson, 2016

NL All-Stars

World Series MVP Award
Donn Clendenon, 1969
Ray Knight, 1986

NLCS MVP AwardSee: National League Championship Series#NLCS results (1969–present) (Series MVP column)Mike Hampton, 
Daniel Murphy, 

Major League Baseball All-Star Game MVP AwardNote: This was re-named the Ted Williams Most Valuable Player Award in 2002.Jon Matlack, 1975 (shared with Bill Madlock)

DHL Hometown Heroes (2006)
Tom Seaver — voted by MLB fans as the most outstanding player in the history of the franchise, based on on-field performance, leadership quality and character value

Sports Illustrated MLB All-Decade Team

Carlos Beltrán, centerfield (2009) (also played with Kansas City and Houston, 2000-04)
Johan Santana, starting pitcher (2009) (also played with Minnesota, 2000-07)

Players Choice Awards Outstanding Pitcher (NL)

R. A. Dickey (2012)
Jacob deGrom (2018)

The Sporting News Reliever of the Year Award

Reliever of the Year Award (starting in 2001)

Armando Benítez, 2001 (shared with Robb Nen)

Fireman of the Year Award (last awarded in 2000)

John Franco, 1990 & 1994

Players Choice Awards Outstanding Rookie (NL)

Jacob DeGrom (2014)

Baseball America All-Rookie TeamSee: Baseball America#Baseball America All-Rookie Team2010 – Ike Davis (1B) and Jon Niese (SP)
2011 – Lucas Duda, OF (one of three)

Topps All-Star Rookie teams

 1962 Al Jackson - LHP
 1963 Jesse Gonder - C
 1965 Ron Swoboda - OF
 1966 Cleon Jones - OF
 1967 Tom Seaver - RHP
 1968 Ken Boswell - 2B
 1968 Jerry Koosman - LHP
 1972 Jon Matlack - LHP
 1981 Hubie Brooks - 3B
 1981 Mookie Wilson - OF
 1983 Darryl Strawberry - OF
 1984 Mike Fitzgerald - C
 1984 Dwight Gooden - RHP
 1985 Roger McDowell - RHP
 1989 Gregg Jefferies - 2B
 1992 Todd Hundley - C
 1992 Jeff Kent - 2B
 2000 Jay Payton - OF
 2001 Tsuyoshi Shinjo - OF
 2003 Ty Wigginton - 3B
 2009 Omir Santos C
 2014 Travis d'Arnaud - C
 2015 Michael Conforto - OF
 2015 Noah Syndergaard - RHP
 2019 Pete Alonso - 1B

Players Choice Awards Comeback Player

Matt Harvey (2015)

The Sporting News Comeback Player of the Year Award
Tommie Agee, 1969
Ray Knight, 1986
Rickey Henderson, 1999
Fernando Tatís, 2008
Matt Harvey, 2015

Sporting News Pitcher of the Year Award
Tom Seaver, 1969, 1975
Dwight Gooden, 1985
R. A. Dickey, 2012
Jacob deGrom, 2018, 2019

Baseball America Major League Executive of the Year
Sandy Alderson, 2015

Other achievements

Hall of FamersSee: New York Mets#Baseball Hall of FamersNew York Mets Hall of Fame

Retired numbersSee: New York Mets#Retired numbersFord C. Frick Award (broadcasters)See: New York Mets#Ford C. Frick Award recipientsNew York BBWAA chapter awardsSee: New York BBWAA chapter awardsSid Mercer–Dick Young Player of the Year Award

Arthur and Milton Richman "You Gotta Have Heart" Award

Joan Payson AwardNote: The award is for excellence in community service.Casey Stengel "You Can Look It Up" AwardNote: The award is to honor career achievement for those who went home empty-handed at previous dinners.Joe DiMaggio "Toast of the Town" AwardThe awards is for a player who has become a New York favorite.William J. Slocum–Jack Lang AwardNote: The award is for long and meritorious service.Ben Epstein–Dan Castellano "Good Guy" AwardNote: The award is for candor and accessibility to writers.Willie, Mickey and the Duke AwardNote: The award is given to a group of players forever linked in baseball history.World Baseball Classic All–WBC Team
 – David Wright (3B)

Associated Press Athlete of the Year
Tom Seaver, 1969
Dwight Gooden, 1985

Sporting News Sportsman of the YearSee: Sporting News#Sportsman of the YearSports Illustrated Sportsman of the Year Award

Tom Seaver, 1969

Hickok BeltSee footnoteTom Seaver, 1969

New Jersey Sports Writers AssociationSee: New Jersey Sports Writers Association''
Man of the Year (1986) – Frank Cashen
Sports Humanitarian of the Year (2001) – Bobby Valentine
Sports Humanitarian of the Year (2008) – David Wright

Minor league system

Baseball America Minor League Player of the Year

 – Dwight Gooden
1986 – Gregg Jefferies
1987 – Gregg Jefferies

Sterling Minor League Organizational Player of the Year

Sterling Minor League Organizational Pitcher of the Year

Sterling Award (team MVPs)

 Each year, nine awards are given to the MVP on each of the nine minor league affiliates

See also
Baseball awards
List of MLB awards

Footnotes

Awa
Major League Baseball team trophies and awards